Josef Tartakower was an international table tennis player from Luxembourg.

He won a silver medal at the 1939 World Table Tennis Championships in the men's doubles with Miloslav Hamr.

See also
 List of table tennis players
 List of World Table Tennis Championships medalists

References

World Table Tennis Championships medalists
Year of birth missing
Possibly living people
Luxembourgian male table tennis players